The 2nd constituency of New Caledonia is a French legislative constituency in New Caledonia.

The second constituency was created in a redistricting in 1978. Between 1978 and a new redistricting in 1986, the second constituency represented the ethnically diverse western shore of the main island, but its main population centre was Nouméa, a largely French-populated loyalist stronghold. Since 1986, the constituency is composed of the so-called brousse - that is, the rural parts of the main island which are mostly Kanak but also the more populous French-populated suburbs of Nouméa.

Deputies

Election results

2022 

 
 
 
|-
| colspan="8" bgcolor="#E9E9E9"|
|-

2017

2012

2007

2002

1997

References

Sources
 Official results of French elections from 1998: 

 Official results of French elections from 2017: 

French legislative constituencies in New Caledonia